Dadibi (also Daribi or Karimui) is a language of eastern Papua New Guinea. In 2001, the Bible (including the Old Testament) was translated into Dadibi.

Distribution
Dadibi is spoken in:
Chimbu Province: Karimui-Nomane District, Tua River system
Southern Highlands Province: Kagua-Erave District, southeast corner, 28 villages
Jiwaka Province: southern extremity, South Waghi Rural LLG

References

Teberan languages
Languages of Simbu Province
Languages of Southern Highlands Province
Languages of Western Highlands Province